The Cold Water School is a historic school building at 2422 Baxter County Road 73, in the White River watershed northeast of Big Flat, Arkansas, on a privately owned inholding within Ozark National Forest.  It was a "traditional one-room schoolhouse".

The building is a modest vernacular wood-frame structure with a gable roof and a fieldstone foundation finished with bubble mortar.  The exterior of the building is finished in stucco, and its interior walls are plaster.  A gabled porch extends from the main facade.  The school was built in 1926, replacing an earlier similar building which was destroyed by fire, and was used as a school until 1960, when the district schools were consolidated.

The building was listed on the National Register of Historic Places in 1926.

See also
National Register of Historic Places listings in Baxter County, Arkansas

References

School buildings on the National Register of Historic Places in Arkansas
One-room schoolhouses in Arkansas
National Register of Historic Places in Baxter County, Arkansas
School buildings completed in 1926
1926 establishments in Arkansas
Educational institutions disestablished in 1960
Ozark–St. Francis National Forest
Schools in Baxter County, Arkansas